Sergei or Sergey Kolesnikov may refer to:

Sergei Kolesnikov (whistleblower) (born 1948), Russian businessman and whistleblower
Sergey Kolesnikov (businessman) (born 1972), Russian billionaire
Sergey Kolesnikov (cyclist) (born 1986), Russian road bicycle racer
Sergei Kolesnikov (actor) (born 1955), Soviet and Russian film and theater actor
Sergey Kolesnikov (judoka) (born 1968), Russian judoka

See also
Kolesnikov (disambiguation)